Banaś is a Polish surname. Some persons with the surname include:

 Adam Banaś (born 1982), Polish professional footballer
 Bolesław Banaś (1912–1991), Polish fencer
 Jan Banaś (born 1943), Polish footballer
 Julia Banaś (born 1997), Polish fashion model
 Kasia Banaś (born 1973), Polish artist
 Marian Banaś (born 1955), Polish politician and civil servant

See also
 Banas (disambiguation)